Flipside is the twelfth studio album by Grammy Award-nominated jazz musician Jeff Lorber.

Awards and nominations
"Flipside" was nominated for Best Pop Instrumental Album at the 48th Annual Grammy Awards but lost to "At This Time" by Burt Bacharach.

Track listing

Personnel 
 Jeff Lorber – keyboards, acoustic piano, Fender Rhodes, Wurlitzer electric piano, guitars, Wah guitar
 Nelson Jackson – keyboards, horns, synth bass 
 Paul Jackson Jr. – guitars, acoustic guitar 
 Robbie Nevil – guitars 
 Eric Wall – guitars 
 Alex Al – bass
 Steve Dubin – bass, drum programming 
 "Little" John Roberts – drums 
 Lenny Castro – congas, percussion 
 David Mann – tenor saxophone, horn arrangements 
 Gary Meek – flute, soprano saxophone, tenor saxophone 
 Ron King – trumpet 
 Victor Lawrence – cello
 Andrea Martin – backing vocals

Production 
 Steve Dubin – producer 
 Jeff Lorber – producer 
 David Rideau – engineer 
 Jaz Colin – mixing 
 Stephen Marcussen – mastering
 Connie Gage – design

References

2005 albums
Jeff Lorber albums